The Operation Solidarity (also known as the Solidarity Crisis) refers to a protest movement in British Columbia, Canada in 1983 that emerged in response to the Social Credit (Socred) government's economic policy of austerity and anti-union legislation. A mass coalition, the Solidarity Coalition, was formed, composed of community organizations and trade unions, which many expected would culminate in a general strike.

References
Defying conventional wisdom: political movements and popular contention against North American free trade, Jeffrey McKelvey Ayres, University of Toronto Press, 1998, pp. 50–53 
The West beyond the West: a history of British Columbia, Jean Barman, University of Toronto Press, 1991 (rev. ed. 1998), pp. 327–328, 
The Solidarity Coalition, in The New Reality (Vancouver: New Star Books), eds. Warren Magnusson, William K. Carroll, Charles Doyle, Monika Langer, and R.B.J. Walker, eds., pp 94–114.

1983 in British Columbia
1983 protests
Labour disputes in British Columbia
1983 labor disputes and strikes